WCRJ (88.1 FM, "The Joy FM 88.1") is a Christian radio station in Jacksonville, Florida. Owned by Radio Training Network, it broadcasts a Christian AC format as part of its The Joy FM network,

History
Prior to 1993, WCRJ was WNCM-FM. The station switched from country music to talk radio in 1995.

88.1 was originally owned by The River Educational Media; until 2011, it was home to The Promise, which was first launched by Concord Media Group on 106.5 FM and was later purchased by Salem Communications. Salem then sold the signal to Cox Radio in 2006 (in which they flipped that station to a simulcast of WOKV, now WXXJ), and The River agreed to take the Promise name and format, under a lease management agreement with The Promise Educational Media Inc.

In 2011, The River sold WCRJ to the Educational Media Foundation, which switched the station to its satellite-based K-Love network on May 1, 2011.

On August 1, 2018, after being sold to Radio Training Network, WCRJ flipped from the EMF's Air1 network to RTN's state-wide "The Joy FM" network.

References

External links
Joy FM Official Website

CRJ
Contemporary Christian radio stations in the United States
Radio stations established in 1984
1984 establishments in Florida
CRJ